Kikai is a Japanese name and may refer to:

Places in Japan
Kikai Caldera, Ōsumi Islands of Kagoshima Prefecture
Kikai Island, one the Amami Islands
Kikai, Kagoshima, a town on Kikaijima, Kagoshima Prefecture

Other uses
Kikai language, a dialect cluster spoken on Kikai Island, Japan
Hiroh Kikai (b. 1945), Japanese photographer